The half sovereign is a British gold coin with a nominal value of half of one pound sterling. It is half the weight (and has half the gold content) of its counterpart 'full' sovereign coin.

The half sovereign was first introduced in 1544 under Henry VIII. After 1604, the issue of half sovereigns, along with sovereigns, was discontinued.

In 1817, following a major revision of British coinage, new versions of half sovereigns and sovereigns were introduced.

Production of British half sovereigns continued until 1926 and, apart from special issues for coronation years, was not restarted until 1980. It was also used extensively in Australia, until 1933.

Since the end of the gold standard, it has been issued only in limited quantities as a bullion or collectors' coin, with a sale price and resale value far in excess of its nominal value, though it continues to be legal tender.

Modern half sovereigns, from 1817 onwards, have a diameter of 19.30 mm, a thickness of c. 0.99 mm, a weight of 3.99 g, are made of 22 carat (91 2⁄3%) crown gold alloy, and contain 0.1176 troy ounces (3.6575 g) of gold. The reverse side, featuring St. George slaying a dragon was designed by Benedetto Pistrucci, whose initials appear to the right of the date.

Background and authorisation 

Henry VII revitalised England’s economy following a civil war and the Black Death. He introduced the sovereign in 1489, which he valued at twenty shillings. Before the new denomination, the only gold coins in circulation were angels and half angels.

Henry VII left a large treasury – the modern equivalent of about £375 million – to his successor Henry VIII, however the inherited wealth was not sustained due to Henry VIII’s extravagant lifestyle and the war expenses needed to maintain a claim over France. Before the Reformation, minting was still carried out by monasteries. Due to a shortage of bullion imported from overseas – Cardinal Wolsey, Chancellor of Exchequer began debasing coinage in 1526 in an attempt to align England’s currency with that of continental Europe. Henry VIII realised he was able to increase his revenue if he continued debasing coins – reducing their fineness, and by introducing new denominations. This decision earned him the nickname "Old Coppernose", describing the copper showing through parts of his portrait that were of low relief on his basest coinage after only a short time in circulation. The era 1542–1551 is now known as the Great Debasement. 

The coinage of Henry VIII can be divided into five classes. The half sovereign valued at ten shillings was introduced in the third alongside the quarter-angel.

The half sovereign continued to be used by Henry VIII’s successor Edward VI. During the reign of Elizabeth I, James I, and Charles I, ten shilling coins were issued in the denominations of half pounds and half unites. Sovereigns and half sovereigns were not to re-emerge until 1817. 

George III ascended in 1760, and by 1801 was the monarch of a United Great Britain and Ireland. Revolutionary war was breaking out, with 13 of the American colonies declaring themselves independent in retaliation to heavy taxation by Britain. The Anglo-French war devastated the British economy, to which the Bank of England responded by issuing banknotes in place of gold coinage for the first time. There was also a surge in Spanish eight reales stamped with the King’s image and the issuing of copper tokens by British businesses.

William Wellesly Pole was appointed Master of the Mint in 1812. Due to the Napoleonic wars, large amounts of gold had left Britain. Pole responded by suggesting new gold coinage of ten shilling, twenty shilling, forty shilling and five-pound pieces, which constituted the Great Recoinage approved in 1816. The modern sovereign and half sovereign featuring the famous design by Benedetto Pistrucci of St George slaying the dragon was proclaimed as currency in 1817, and minting commenced later that year.

Mintage of the denominations has continued since, with no alterations in weight and fineness.

Circulation years

1544–1547 
Half Sovereigns were part of the third class of coinage introduced by Henry VIII in 1544. As well as an increase in the value of gold of 10% in 1526, the standard fineness of coins was debased so that the sovereign valued at 22s.6d. weighed 192 grains (12.4 grams) compared to 240 grains (15.6 grams) when Henry VIII began his reign. The half sovereign which weighs 96 grains (6.2 grams), replaced the ryal valued at ten shillings. The debasement of gold coins went from 23 7/8 carat fine to 23 carats, and then 22 carats and finally only 20 carats fineness (0.96 fine). This was the first time gold had been minted below the standard of 23 carats of fineness. 

The half sovereign of Henry VIII measures at 30 mm in diameter and weighs 100 or 19 grains (6.22 grams). In 1544–1547, three different half sovereigns were minted at the Tower, Southwark and Bristol mints; therefore, each featured the mint marks of their respective mints. Marsh describes the obverse of these half sovereigns: "…featuring the portrait of a crowned King Henry VIII seated in his chair of state holding his sceptre and orb, the Tudor rose at his feet." The reverse features a crowned shield which is quartered, containing the arms of France and England held by a lion and dragon.

1547–1553 
Edward VI succeeded his father at only nine years of age. Half sovereigns were struck at the Tower and Southwark mints at this time and the half sovereigns exclusively feature his youthful portrait. Aside from featuring the portrait of Edward VI, the addition of "EDWARD 6" to the legend of some coins and featuring different mint marks, half sovereigns of this time do not differ from previous issues.

From 1549–550 half sovereigns minted at the Tower Mint, and Durham House featured an uncrowned bust of Edward VI on the obverse. London, Southwark and Durham House mints struck half-length crowned busts of the king.

Edward VI wrote in his diary that he wished to rectify the debasement of coinage during the reign of his father, and in 1549 the fineness of the half sovereign was increased from 20 carat to 22 carat fineness. Coins of this issue have the Roman numeral "VI" instead of "6" after the King's name.

From 1550–1553, fineness of gold coins was increased to 23 carats. The Half sovereign featured a crowned King Edward VI in armour, holding a sceptre and sword on the obverse. The reverse features a crowned shield of heraldic arms. The legend reads "SCVTVM FIDEI PROTEGET EVM" which is translated as "The shield of faith shall protect him", although, some half sovereigns have "TIMOR DOMINE FONS VITE" or "The fear of the Lord is the fountain of Life" from Proverbs 14:27, and also "LVCERNA PEDIBVS MEIS VERBVM TVVM" which means "Thy word is a lantern unto my feet" from Pslam 119:105.

1603 
The first coinage of James I commenced in 1603 and features a crowned bust on the obverse, and a crowned shield on the reverse and thistle mint mark. The shield of arms featured on James I’s coinage features the lions of England and the fleurs-de-lis of France in the first and fourth quarters, the second quarter features the lion of Scotland and the third quarter the harp of Ireland. The reverse legend reads “EXVRGAT DEVS DISSIPENTVR INIMICI” which translates as “Let God arise and let His enemies be scattered” from Psalms 68:1. In 1604, James I reduced the weight of gold coinage, and renamed sovereigns and half sovereigns to unites and half unites.

Half sovereigns were to be replaced by James I's successor Charles II by the half guinea.

1816–1820 
The reign of George III saw many changes in the numismatic landscape. Paper currency was used rather than gold for the first time, and the invention of steam power revolutionised coin manufacturing. 

What are considered the first modern half sovereigns were introduced in 1817, as they are the first milled half sovereigns, or as Marsh cites that Ruding describes them as: "[the coins] with a new invented graining on the edge of the piece", and also because there has been no change in the weight of 61.637 grains (3.994 grams) and 22 carat fineness since. These coins were valued at 10 shillings and replaced the seven shilling piece or quarter guinea. 

The obverse of the half sovereign features the portrait of George III wearing a laurel wreath surrounded by the inscription “GEORGIUS III DEI GRATIA”, which was designed by famous die cutter Benedetto Pistrucci. On the Reverse which was designed by William Wyon, there is a crowned shield bearing the Ensigns Armorial of the United Kingdom and the Hanoverian arms in the centre of the shield. The reverse legend reads “BRITANNIARUM REX FID:DEF”. Coins were minted between 1817–1819, however, sovereigns of 1819 are extremely rare and no half sovereigns from this year have been recorded.

1820–1830 
The first type of half sovereign minted during the reign of George IV  features his portrait engraved by Pistrucci wearing a laurel wreath on the obverse and an ornately garnished crowned shield on the reverse which was designed by Johann Baptist Merlen.  These coins which were issued in 1821 were quickly withdrawn due to their similarity in appearance to the sixpence, meaning that the sixpence could be gilded and passed off as a half sovereign. 

A second type was issued and differs in that the shield on the reverse is plain, whilst a third type features a bareheaded king. 

Another type is similar to the third but has an extra tuft of hair in the portrait and a heavier border. Pistrucci’s bust design was replaced by an engraving by William Wyon, as Pistrucci had upset George IV by refusing to copy the bust sculpture by Sir Francis Chantrey.

1830–1837 
Half sovereigns were not issued as a currency piece during the reign of William IV until 1834. The small size half sovereign is 17.9mm in diameter and the obverse features a bare head bust of William IV, which was engraved by William Wyon from the bust of William IV by Sir Francis Chantrey. There is a crowned shield and mantle on the reverse which was modelled and engraved by Jean Baptise Merlen. These coins were struck with both plain and milled edges. 

The large size half sovereign measures 19.4mm in diameter with a similar design.

There was also an error dated 1836 struck from a Sixpence die.  Mint ledgers from this reign record that £60,000 or 120,000 half sovereigns dated 1834 being recalled due to their similarity to the seven shilling or third guinea pieces, which were being gilded and used as counterfeit.

Victoria, 1837–1901

Young head coinage, 1838–1887 

The first half sovereigns of Victoria’s reign were issued in 1838. The coins feature William Wyon’s youthful portrait of Victoria on the obverse, of which there are five variations and a shield reverse with the escutcheon containing the Hanoverian arms omitted as the right to the Kingdom of Hanover was exclusively for the male line of succession. The type A2 features the second head of Victoria with the date below on the obverse and the die number below the shield on the reverse. The type A3 featured the third and larger portrait. Type A4 features the fourth young head which has a hair ribbon. Type A5 features the fifth young head which shows no front ear lobe. 

The Victorian era saw the introduction of branch mints for the first time, beginning with The Sydney Branch Mint, and growing to include The Melbourne Branch Mint.

Jubilee coinage 1887–1893 
The first half sovereigns with the new veiled bust were issued in 1887 for the Queen’s golden jubilee. Coins were minted at the Royal Mint in London from 1887–1893 but not in 1888 or 1889, and at The Melbourne Branch Mint in 1887 and 1893, as well as The Sydney Branch Mint in 1887, 1889 and 1891. Coinage features an older crowned bust of Victoria on the obverse and shield reverse.

Old head coinage 1893–1901 
The obverse features an older featured veiled bust by engraver Thomas Brock, and the reverse features the famous design of St. George slaying the dragon for the first time on a half sovereign. The Legend also has the addition “IND. IMP.” (Empress of India). Coins were minted for the first time at The Perth Branch Mint.

1901–1910 
The first half sovereigns during Edward VII’s reign were issued in 1902 and continued until 1910. The coin features a bare head bust of Edward VII on the obverse and St. George reverse. Coins were minted in London, Melbourne, Perth and Sydney.

1910–1936 
Half sovereigns of this reign were first issued in 1911 and continued until 1915, however, they continued to be struck at the branch mints at later dates, including the new branch mint of Pretoria in South Africa. The coin features a bare head bust of George V on the obverse and a St. George reverse.

World War I saw that gold was withdrawn from circulation in order to pay for war materials and essential imports.

1936–1952 
Half sovereigns were not introduced into circulation at this time, however, there was a gold proof half sovereign issued for the Coronation in 1937. The coin features a bare head bust of George VI on the obverse and St. George reverse, and only plain edge coins were minted.

Australian half sovereign 

In response to large amounts of unrefined gold circulating during the Gold Rush, The Sydney Mint was approved in 1853 and opened in 1855; thus, the Sydney General Hospital became the first overseas branch of the London Royal Mint. The Sydney Mint issued the Australia reverse Sydney Mint half sovereigns from 1855–1866, the first year was a very low mintage and the coins are very rare. The next issues were the British Imperial type from the Sydney Mint in 1871 and Melbourne in 1872. The Perth Mint first issued half sovereigns in 1900 and the last issue was in 1918.

Bullion and mintages were reclaimed by the British economy and sent via ship to Europe, including the sovereign. This meant that the lower valued half sovereign was in heavy circulation in Australia.

Modern collector and bullion Coin 
The half sovereigns of Elizabeth II continue to be minted as proofs and as bullion. A new half sovereign is released annually, as well as special issues. Sovereigns from various reigns continue to be of special interest to collectors, and often sell for a far greater price than their nominal value.

Benedetto Pistrucci's St George Slaying the Dragon 
As Myatt and Hanley describe, the design of St George slaying the dragon is an example of a numismatic motif, with a similar design being used in 320 BC on a silver Macedonian coin and appearing on later Roman coinage. St George was made England’s patron saint by Richard the Lionheart. The design on sovereigns and half sovereigns issued during the reign of George III, features his namesake saint slaying the Napoleonic dragon of Waterloo.

The Italian die-cutter responsible – Benedetto Pistrucci was appointed as an assistant engraver at the Royal Mint on June 26, 1816. After the death of Chief Engraver Thomas Wyon in 1817, Pistrucci took over his duties, however, his Italian ethnicity prevented him from inheriting Wyon’s official title. Pistrucci’s wax models of St George could not be reproduced by any of the Mint engravers, so his original design was used in 1817. The design features a classic Greek warrior on horseback and was such a success with the public, it eventually did earn Pistrucci the title of Chief Engraver at the Royal Mint.

The original design was continued into the reign of George IV, however, whilst the design was used for sovereigns, it only commenced to be featured on half sovereigns in 1893 during the reign of Victoria.

Orientation of effigees/busts 
As J.J. Cullimore Allen states in Sovereigns of the British Empire,

"As is well known, it has long been the tradition that the effigee or bust of each succeeding monarch faces in the opposite direction to that of the predecessor. The result of this custom, as they affect the sovereign [and half sovereign], are as follows:

George III faces to the right

George IV faces to the left

William IV faces to the right

Victoria faces to the left

Edward VII faces to the right

George V faces to the left

Edward VIII faces to the left

George VI faces to the left

Elizabeth II faces to the right."

There is a break in consistency of this custom from Edward VIII to George VI, however, the Royal Mint proceeded with the custom following the ascension of George VI as though there had been none.

Specimens and mintages

Counterfeiting
The half sovereign is a "protected coin" for the purposes of Part II of the Forgery and Counterfeiting Act 1981.

See also
Quarter sovereign – introduced in 2009

References

External links

British Coins – Free information about British coins. Includes an online forum.
Online Coin Club / Coins from United Kingdom / Half Sovereign (Pre-Decimal)

English gold coins
British gold coins
Coins of Australia
1544 introductions
1544 establishments in England
Bullion coins
Half-base-unit coins
Saint George and the Dragon